Hechtia suaveolens is a species of plant in the genus Hechtia. This species was described in 1896 from a herbarium specimen of unknown origin, probably Mexico. It is most likely extinct.

References

suaveolens
Flora of Mexico
Plants described in 1896